The First Secretary of the Central Committee of the Young Communist League is the highest office within the Young Communist League, the youth wing of the Communist Party of Cuba. The current first secretary is Yuniasky Crespo Baquero.

Officeholders

References

First Secretary
1962 establishments in Cuba